This is a bibliography of the works of Maxim Gorky.

Novels
 Orphan Paul (Luckless Pavel; Горемыка Павел, 1894)
 Foma Gordeyev (Фома Гордеев, 1899, also translated as Foma Gordyeeff and The Man Who Was Afraid)
 Three of Them (Трое, 190, also translated as The Three and Three Men)
 Mother (Мать, 1906)
 The Life of a Useless Man (Жизнь ненужного человека, 1908, also translated as The Spy: A Story of a Superfluous Man) 
 A Confession (Исповедь, 1908)
 Городок Окуров, 1908
 The Life of Matvei Kozhemyakin (Жизнь Матвея Кожемякина, 1910)
 The Artamonov Business (Дело Артамоновых, 1925)
 The Life of Klim Samgin (Жизнь Клима Самгина, 1927-1936). Published in English as Forty Years: The Life of Clim Samghin
 Bystander (1930, Part 1)
 The Magnet (1931, Part 2)
 Other Fires (1931, Part 3)
 The Specter (1938, Part 4)

Novellas
 Konovalov (Коновалов, 1897)
 The Orlovs (Супруги Орловы, 1897)
 Creatures That Once Were Men (Бывшие люди, 1897)
 Varenka Olesova (Варенька Олесова, 1898)
 Лето, 1909

Short stories
 "Makar Chudra" (Макар Чудра, 1892)
 "Emelyan Pilyai" (Емельян Пилай, 1893)
 "The Siskin That Lied and the Woodpecker That Loved the Truth" (О чиже, который лгал и о дятле – любителе истины, 1893)
 "Old Arkhip and Lyonka" (Дед Архип и Лёнька, 1893)
 "My Fellow Traveller" (Мой спутник, 1894)
 "About a Little Boy and a Little Girl Who did not Freeze to Death. A Christmas Story (О мальчике и девочке, которые не замёрзли. Святочный рассказ, 1894)
 "The Song of the Falcon" (Песня о Соколе, 1894)
 "One Autumn Night" (Однажды осенью, 1895) 
 "A Mistake" (Ошибка, 1895)
 "Conclusion" (Вывод, 1895)
 "Old Izergil" (Старуха Изергиль, 1895)
 "Chelkash" (Челкаш, 1895)
 "The Affair of the Clasps" (Дело с застёжками, 1896)
 "On a Raft" (На плотах, 1896)
 "The Khan and His Son" (Хан и его сын, 1896)
 "Malva" (Мальва, 1897)
 "Boles" (Болесь, 1897, translated also as "Her Lover")
 "Comrades" (Товарищи, 1897)
 "In the Steppe" (В степи, 1897)
 "The Green Kitten" (1897)
 "Mischief-Maker" (Проходимец, 1897)
 "Goltva Fair" (Ярмарка в Голтве, 1897)
 "Mischievous Lad" (Озорник, 1897)
 "Boredom" (Скуки ради, 1897)
 "Heartache" (1897)
 "An Adulterous Wife" (1897)
 "An Insolent Man" (1897)
 "Chums" (Дружки, 1898)
 "A Rolling Stone" (1898)
 "Cain and Artyom" (Каин и Артём, 1898)
 "A Reader" (1898)
 "Twenty-six Men and a Girl" (Двадцать шесть и одна, 1899)
 "Waiting for the Ferry" (1899)
 "Red" (1899)
 "Concerning the Devil" (1899)
 "The Hungry Ones" (1899)
 "Commonplace People" (1903)
 "Soldiers" (1905)
 "Prison" (Тюрьма, 1905)
 "Three Days" (1905)
 "Bukoyomov" (Букоёмов, Карл Иванович, 1905)
 "The Story of Filipp Vasilyevich" (Рассказ Филиппа Васильевича, 1905)
 "The Kingdom of Tedium" (1906)
 "Mob" (1906)
 "An Incident From the Life of Makar" (1912)
 "In Old Russia" (1913)
 "The Master" (1913)
 "First Love" (1923)
 "The Birth of a Man" (1923)
 "In a Mountain Defile" (1923)
 "Kalinin" (1923)
 "The Deadman" (1923)
 "Hodgepodge" (1923)
 "An Evening at Shamov's" (1923)
 "An Evening at Panashkin's" (1923)
 "An Evening at Sukmomyatkin's" (1923)
 "Light-Grey and Light-Blue" (1923)
 "A Book" (1923)
 "How They Composed a Song" (1923)
 "Bird's Sin" (1923)
 "A Silver Ten-Copeck Piece" (1923)
 "Happiness" (1923)
 "A Hero" (1923)
 "A Clown" (1923)
 "Onlookers" (1923)
 "Timka" (1923)
 "A Light-Minded Man" (1923)
 "Strasti-Mordasti" (1923)
 "By Changul River" (1923)
 "A Jolly Chap" (1923)
 "A Romantic" (1923)
 "A Little Girl" (1923)
 "A Fire" (1923)
 "A Theft" (1923)
 "Bandits" (1923)
 "Complaints" (1923)
 Stories of 1922-1924 (Рассказы 1922—1924 годов, 1925)
 "The Hermit" (Отшельник, 1922)
 "Unrequited Love" (Tale of Unrequited Love, A Story of Unrequited Love, Рассказ о безответной любви, 1923)
 "The Story of a Novel" (Рассказ об одном романе, 1923)
 "Karamora" (Карамора, 1923)
 "An Enigma" (An Incident, Анекдот, 1923)
 "The Story of a Hero" (Рассказ о герое, 1924)
 "The Rehearsal" (Репетиция, 1924)
 "The Sky-Blue Life" (Голубая жизнь, 1924)
 "A Story About the Unusual" (Рассказ о необыкновенном, 1924)
 "Murderers" (1925)

Plays
 The Philistines (translated also as Smug Citizens and The Petty Bourgeois; Мещане, 1901)
 The Lower Depths (На дне, 1902)
 Summerfolk (also, Vacationers; Дачники, 1904)
 Children of the Sun (Дети солнца, 1905)
 Barbarians (Варвары, 1905)
 Enemies (Враги, 1906)
 The Last Ones (Последние, 1908)
 Children (translated also as The Reception, Дети, 1910)
 Queer People (Чудаки, 1910)
 Vassa Zheleznova (Васса Железнова, 1910/1936)
 The Zykovs (Зыковы, 1913)
 Counterfeit Money (Фальшивая монета, 1913)
 The Old Man (also: The Judge, Старик, 1915, revised 1922, 1924)
 Workaholic Slovotekov (Работяга Словотеков, 1920)
 Somov and Others (Сомов и другие, 1930)
 Yegor Bulychov and Others (Егор Булычев и другие, 1932)
 Dostigayev and Others (Достигаев и другие, 1933)

Poetry 
 "A Maiden and Death" (Девушка и смерть, 1892 [fairytale in verse])
 "The Song of the Stormy Petrel" (Песня о Буревестнике, 1901)
 "A Ballad of Countess Helene de Corsi" (1923)

Short-story collections 
 City of the Yellow Devil (Город Жёлтого дьявола, 1906)
 Tales of Italy (Сказки об Италии, 1911–1913)
 Through Russia (По Руси, 1923)
 Stories 1922-1924 (Рассказы 1922—1924 годов, 1925)

Autobiography
 My Childhood (Autobiography Part I, 1913–1914); In the World (Autobiography Part II, 1916); My Universities (Autobiography Part III, 1923)
 Fragments from My Diary (1923)

Non-fiction
 "The Black Hundred Pogromists" (not dated)
 "Russian Tsar" (1905)
 "Magnificent France" (1905)
 "My Interviews" (1905)
 "Fair France" (1905)
 "One of the Kings of the Republic" (1906)
 "Pillar of Morality" (1906)
 "The Masters of Life" (1906)
 "A Priest of Morals" (1906)
 "On the Jews" (1906)
 "On Zionism" (1907)
 "January 9th" (1907)
 "Cynicism" (1908)
 Self-Taught Writers (1911)
 "The Karamazov Spirit" (1913)
 "On the Bolsheviki" (1918)
 Untimely Thoughts (1918)
 My Recollections of Tolstoy (1919)
 "Leonid Andreyev" (1922)
 The Times of Korolenko (1923)
 "N. E. Karonin-Petropavlovsky" (1923)
 "A. P. Chekhov" (1923)
 "Leo Tolstoy" (1923)
 "M. M. Kotsyubinsky" (1923)
 "N. A. Bugrov" (1924)
 About S. A. Tolstaya (1924)
 Days with Lenin (1924)
 V. Lenin (1925)
 "Sergei Yesenin"
 "N. F. Annensky" (1924)
 "About Garin-Mikhailovsky" (1925)
 "About Cockroaches" (1925)
 "Notes of a Leader" (1925)
 "L. B. Krasin"
 "Ten Years" (1927)
 "New and Old" (1927)
 "My Greetings" (1927)
 "To Anonymous and Pseudonymous Writers" (1927)
 "Our Achievements" (1928)
 "Culture" (1928)
 "To Mechanical Citizens of the Soviet Union" (1928)
 "The Red Army" (1928)
 "Benefits of Literacy" (1928)
 "Literary Beginners" (1928)
 "Literature of the Peoples of the USSR" (1928)
 On Guard for the Soviet Union (1930)
 "Women" (1930)
 "Wise Folk" (1930)
 "Humanists" (1930)
 On Literature (1930)
 "A Hurricane Destroying the Old World" (1931)
 "Facts of Life" (1931)
 "Under the Red Banner" (1931)
 "To Participants in the Civil War" (1931)
 Talks on the Craft (1931)
 Literary Technique" (1932)
 Socialist Realism (1933)
 "Prose" (1933)
 "On Plays" (1933)
 Soviet Literature (1934)
 "Proletarian Humanism" (1934)
 A History of Woman (1934)
 "Literary Curiosities" (1934)
 The I.V. Stalin White Sea – Baltic Sea Canal (1934)
 Culture and the People (1935)
 "The New Man" (1935)
 "On the Issue of Demons''" (1935)

References

External links
 

Bibliographies by writer
Bibliographies of Russian writers